Thomas Newton Lanning (April 22, 1907 – November 4, 1967) was a professional baseball player. He was a left-handed pitcher for one season (1938) with the Philadelphia Phillies. For his career, he compiled a 0–1 record, with a 6.43 earned run average, and two strikeouts in seven innings pitched.

A single in his only at-bat left Lanning with a rare MLB career batting average of 1.000. His only decision came in the same game when the Phillies lost to the Brooklyn Dodgers, 8–1, on September 24, 1938.

An alumnus of Wake Forest University, Lanning was born in Biltmore, North Carolina, and died in Marietta, Georgia, at the age of 60.

Lanning's younger brother, Johnny, was also an MLB pitcher.

References

External links

1907 births
1967 deaths
Philadelphia Phillies players
Major League Baseball pitchers
Baseball players from North Carolina
Winston-Salem Twins players
High Point Pointers players
Asheville Tourists players
Portsmouth Truckers players
Greenwood Chiefs players
Dothan Boll Weevils players
Dothan Browns players
Montgomery Rebels players
Memphis Chickasaws players
Birmingham Barons players
Wake Forest University alumni